'The Arts Foundation of New Zealand Te Tumu Toi is a New Zealand arts organisation that supports artistic excellence and facilitates private philanthropy through raising funds for the arts and allocating it to New Zealand artists.

The concept of setting up an organisation to raise private funding for the arts was initiated by Creative New Zealand in 1997. Its chair Brian Stevenson approached Richard Cathie to chair a working party on the subject and Sir Ronald Scott was appointed consultant, with help from Gisella Carr. Early working party members and trustees included Lady Mary Hardie Boys,
Lady Gillian Deane, Dame Jenny Gibbs, Sir Paul Reeves, Sir John Todd, Sir Miles Warren and Sir Eion Edgar.

The foundation was incorporated as a charitable Trust in 1998 with Richard Cathie remaining as chair. Seed funding of $5m was secured from The Lottery Grants Board payable over 5 years and the foundation was launched in 2000.

The foundation produces award programmes that provide recognition and money prizes to New Zealand artists working in across all art forms. This includes writers, fine artists, musicians, dancers, choreographers, theatre-makers and screen artists.

Background
In 2002 Simon Bowden was appointed Executive Director and in 2003 the organisation held its first awards. By 2008 the Arts Foundation had established an endowment fund of 6 million and donated $3 million to over 100 artists across arts disciplines.

In 2012 the Arts Foundation launched Boosted a crowdsourced funding platform. The Arts Foundation Awards celebrate achievement in an artists career. Donations come from Patrons of the Arts Foundation and other sources and are awarded directly to artists at the annual New Zealand Arts Awards.

Promotion of the arts is also part of the mandate of the Arts Foundation. In September 2019, the Arts Foundation launched the first New Zealand Arts Month. This campaign was supported by Creative NZ, Chartwell Trust, NZME, Phantom and Go Media.

Awards 
There is no application for the awards. Artists are selected by an independent panel of arts peers or curators and recipients of awards are selected without their knowing they are under consideration. The Arts Foundation administers this process.

The Icon Awards, Whakamana Hiranga recognise a lifetime of achievement. Artists considered to have prominence and outstanding potential receive The Laureate Award. Artists in the early stages of their career were selected to receive a New Generation Award, and now receive a Springboard Award and mentorship from a Laureate or Icon.

In partnership, the foundation produces the Marti Friedlander Photographic Award, of $25,000NZD to assist the career of a photographer, and the Harriet Friedlander Residency, which is a residency in New York valued at $80,000NZD.

The Mallinson Rendel Illustrators Award was presented for the first time in 2011. The award is presented every two years to a children's book illustrator with published work of a high standard and includes a cash gift of $15,000.

The Arts Foundation also administers the Katherine Mansfield Menton Fellowship awarding a residency to Menton in France for a writer.

Icon Award

The Arts Foundation of New Zealand established the Icon Awards as a means to celebrate and acknowledge New Zealand art-makers who have achieved the highest standards of artistic expression.

Limited to a living circle of 20, Icons are pioneers and leaders from all arts disciplines, living and working around the world. To date, 41 artists have been acknowledged as Icons. In 2003, eight artists were honoured, followed by one in 2004, seven in 2005, five in 2007, five in 2011, five in 2013, two in 2015, five in 2018, and three in 2020.

Each Icon receives a medallion and pin designed by sculptor John Edgar. The recipient is gifted the pin in perpetuity, while the medallion is presented to a successor at a future Icon Award ceremony following the artist's death.

In 2008 the Arts Foundation began commissioning oral histories from Icons. In time, the foundation hopes that an oral history will be deposited with the Alexander Turnbull Library in Wellington covering the life of each Icon artist. This will ensure the artists' stories are on public record and available for future generations.

In October 2020, multiple allegations of historical sexual abuse were made against composer Jack Body, who had received the award in 2015 shortly before his death, by a number of his former students. In November 2020, the allegations were described by Victoria University as "very credible", and the Arts Foundation announced that it had suspended Body's status as an Arts Icon while it "awaited further information".  In January 2022, following a formal apology by the university to these students, the Arts Foundation confirmed that his award was no longer recognised by the organisation.

Living Icons

Deceased Icons

Laureate Award
Initially there were five artists honoured annually at the New Zealand Arts Awards ceremony receiving a Laureate Award of a NZ$50,000 grant each and a commissioned sculpture by Terry Stringer. No awards were awarded in 2018, and in 2019 the amount of the prize changed to NZ$25,000, new partnerships and awards were introduced and the Laureate Award will be given to up to ten practising artists.

Named awards 
Established in 2019:

 The Theresa Gattung Female Arts Practitioners Award (awarded every year)
 The Burr/ Tatham Trust Award (awarded every second year)
 Gaylene Preston Documentary Film Makers Award (NZ$30,000 awarded every second year)

Established in 2020:

 The Sir Roger Hall Theatre Award (NZ$25,000 awarded every second year, $5,000 awarded to more people the other year as Out of the Limelight awards)
 The My Art Visual Arts Award (awarded every year)
 Te Moana-nui-a-Kiwa Award

Laureate Artists are New Zealanders practicing in any arts discipline, located anywhere in the world. The criteria has changed away from the terminology of 'best' which is subjective in the arts, instead focusing on the significance of work and the impact on New Zealand. The Arts Foundation website states: Arts Foundation Laureate Awards celebrate and empower New Zealand’s most outstanding practising artists - artists whose practise also has an impact on New Zealand.Laureates are able to use their award in any way they choose, for example, in the creation of new works, or the freedom to concentrate time and resources into the development of their career.

Recipients

2000
 Briar Grace-Smith, Theatre
 Elizabeth Knox, Literature
 Peter Peryer, Visual Arts
 Gillian Whitehead, Music
 Douglas Wright, Dance

2001
 Phil Dadson, Visual Arts
 Kate De Goldi, Literature
 Michael Parekowhai, Visual Arts
 Gaylene Preston, Film/Moving Image

2002
 Warwick Freeman, Visual Arts
 Shona McCullagh, Dance
 Don McGlashan, Music
 Helen Medlyn, Music
 Jacob Rajan, Theatre

2003
 Jenny Bornholdt, Literature
 Neil Dawson, Visual Arts
 Michael Hurst, Theatre
 Humphrey Ikin, Visual Arts
 John Psathas, Music

2004
 Barry Barclay, Film/Moving Image
 Jack Body, Music
 Derek Lardelli, Visual Arts
 John Pule, Visual Arts
 Ann Robinson, Visual Arts

2005
 Neil Ieremia, Dance
 Bill Manhire, Literature
 Julia Morison, Visual Arts
 Simon O'Neill, Music
 Ronnie van Hout, Visual Arts

2006
 Alun Bollinger, Film/Moving Image
 Alastair Galbraith, Music
 Oscar Kightley, Theatre
 John Reynolds, Visual Arts
 Ian Wedde, Literature

2007
 Michael Houstoun, Music
 Sarah-Jayne Howard, Dance
 Colin McColl, Theatre
 Moana Maniapoto, Music
 Merilyn Wiseman, Visual Arts

2008
 Shane Cotton, Visual Arts
 Ngila Dickson, Visual Arts
 George Henare, Theatre
 Lloyd Jones, Literature
 Teddy Tahu Rhodes, Music

2009
 Lyonel Grant, Visual Arts
 Witi Ihimaera, Literature
 Chris Knox, Music
 Richard Nunns, Music
 Anne Noble, Visual Arts

2010
 Stuart Devenie, Theatre
 Michael Parmenter, Dance
 Leon Narbey, Film/Moving Image
 Gareth Farr, Music 
 John Parker, Visual Arts

2011
 Whirimako Black, Music
 Fiona Pardington, Visual Arts
 Emily Perkins, Literature
 Lemi Ponifasio, Dance
 Leanne Pooley, Film/Moving Image

2012
 Ruia Aperahama, Music 
 Tony de Lautour, Visual Arts
 Rachel House, Theatre 
 Gregory O'Brien, Literature
 Fiona Samuel, Theatre

2013
 Laurence Aberhart, Visual Arts
 Jane Campion, Film/Moving Image
 Dean Parker, Theatre
 Damien Wilkins, Literature
 Megan Wraight, landscape architect

2014
 Cliff Curtis, Film
 Lisa Reihana, Visual Arts
 Geoff Cochrane, Literature
 Ross Harris, Music
 Charles Koroneho, Dance

2015
 Delaney Davidson – Music
 Sara Brodie – Theatre / Dance
 Wetini Mitai-Ngatai – Performance / Cultural Entrepreneurship
 Daniel Belton – Music / Dance / Film
 Lisa Walker – Visual Art

2016
 Eleanor Catton – writer
 Lyell Cresswell – composer
 Dylan Horrocks – cartoonist, graphic novelist, writer
 Peter Robinson – visual artist
 Taika Waititi – filmmaker

2017
 Niki Caro – director, filmmaker
 Jemaine Clement – actor, writer, comedian, multi-instrumentalist
 Ross McCormack – choreographer, contemporary dancer
 Rob Ruha – haka soul musician
 Robin White – painter, printmaker

2019
 Sima Urale – filmmaker
 Pietra Brettkelly – filmmaker
 Solomon Mortimer – photographer
 Laurence Fearnley – writer
 Kris Sowersby – typographer
 Louise Potiki Bryant – choreographer
 Ruth Paul – writer, illustrator
 Val Smith – performance artist
 Coco Solid – mixed-media artist
 Yvonne Todd – photographer

2020
Yuki Kihara – interdisciplinary artist
Ariana Tikao – singer, composer, taonga puoro player
Moss Te Ururangi Patterson – choreographer, artistic director
Ahi Karunaharan – actor, writer, director, producer
FAFSWAG – interdisciplinary arts
Shayne Carter – musician, author
Tusiata Avia – poet, writer, performer

2021
Nigel Borell – art curator
Shane Bosher – actor, theatre director
Harry Culy – photographer
Brett Graham – sculptor
Florian Habicht – film director
Rangi Kipa – carver, illustrator
Nina Nawalowalo – theatre director
Maisey Rika – musician
Vasanti Unka – writer, illustrator

2022
 Lindah Lepou – fashion designer
 Tame Iti – activist, artist, poet and actor
 Mata Aho Collective – Māori women's art collective
 Maureen Lander – multimedia installation artist
 Areta Wilkinson – jeweller
 Hone Kouka – playwright
 Paula Morris – novelist, essayist and short story writer

Out of the Limelight Award recipients for 2021 were: 
 Elizabeth Whiting – costume designer
 Marcus McShane – lighting designer and visual artist
 Harold Moot – set designer
 Eric Gardiner – stage manager
 Playmarket – the playwrights’ agency and script development organisation

New Generation Award
The Arts Foundation of New Zealand New Generation Awards, celebrate artists’ early achievements through an investment in each recipient’s career.  Biennially, five artists are awarded $25,000NZD each, and a sculpture designed by glass artist Christine Cathie. Although still at an early stage of their career, the artists will have already demonstrated excellence and innovation through their work.

Similar to other Arts Foundation Awards, the New Generation Award may be presented to an artist working in any arts discipline. Teacher, critic, theorist and organiser of contemporary creative practices, Jon Bywater (Auckland) curated the award in 2006, while writer, teacher, painter, curator Gregory O'Brien (Wellington) undertook the role in 2008 and arts radio journalist Lynn Freeman in 2010.

Recipients

2007
Eve Armstrong, Visual artists
Warren Maxwell, Music
Tze Ming Mok, Literature
Joe Sheehan, Visual arts
Taika Waititi, Film/moving image

2008
Jeff Henderson, Music
Alex Monteith, Visual arts*
Madeleine Pierard, Music
Jo Randerson, Literature
Pippa Sanderson, Literature

2010
Eleanor Catton, Literature
Ngaahina Hohaia, Visual arts
Anna Leese, Music
Kate Parker, Theatre/Puppetry*
Mark Albiston and Louis Sutherland, Film/moving image (joint recipients)

2011
Ben Cauchi, Visual arts
Sam Hamilton, Music
Eli Kent, Theatre

2012
Pip Adam, Literature
Shigeyuki Kihara, Visual arts
Cameron McMillan, Dance

2013
Kushana Bush, Visual Arts
Kip Chapman, Theatre
SJD (Sean James Donnelly), Music

2014
Dudley Benson, Music
Star Gossage, Visual Arts
Vela Manusaute and Anapela Polataivao, Theatre (joint recipients)

2015
Anna Smaill, Literature
Simon Denny, Visual artist
Tusi Timothy Tamasese, Film

2017
Hera Lindsay Bird – Poet
Salina Fisher – Contemporary classical composer, violinist
Tiffany Singh – Interdisciplinary site specific installation based artist

Springboard Award 
From 2020 a Springboard award is given to up to ten emerging artists. This consists of NZ$15,000 and mentoring from one of the alumni of Arts Foundation Laureates, Icons, New Generation, residency or Fellowship recipients. Criteria relates to potential for a sustainable career.

Recipients 
2021
Cora-Allan Wickliffe
Cian Parker
Ta’alili – Aloalii Tapu
Tori Manley-Tapu
Reuben Jelleyman
Maisie Chilton
Hōhua Ropate Kurene
Larsen Winiata Tito-Taylor

2020
Min-Young Her - performance art, sculpture
Matasila Freshwater - writer, director
Ayesha Green - visual arts (painter)
Arjuna Oakes - musician
Moana Ete - writer, film maker, musician, curator
Bala Murali Shingade - film maker, writer, theatre maker

Mallinson Rendel Illustrators Award 
The inaugural Mallinson Rendel Illustrators award, initially worth $10,000 occurred in 2011. It has been awarded every two years up to 2017, and has increased in value.

Recipients 

 David Elliot (2011) 
 Gavin Bishop (2013)
 Jenny Cooper (2015) 
 Donovan Bixley (2017)

Award for Patronage
The Arts Foundation of New Zealand Award for Patronage is made annually to a person, couple, or private trust for the outstanding private contributions they have made to the arts.  The Award for Patronage is presented by Perpetual Trust.

As a community of artists and arts supporters, the Arts Foundation honours those who contribute significantly as patrons. Annually, a donation of $20,000NZD from the Arts Foundation is provided to the recipient of this award for them to distribute to artists, arts projects or arts organisations of their choice.  Philanthropists Denis and Verna Adam (2006), Dame Jenny Gibbs (2007), Lady Gillian and Sir Roderick Deane (2008), Adrienne, Lady Stewart (2009) and Gus & Irene Fisher (2010) have been recipients.  All recipients have chosen to double the funds for distribution through a matching contribution of $20,000NZD, with Gus and Irene Fisher donating $30,000NZD of their own funds, meaning an annual distribution of up to $50,000NZD. Recipients have also chosen to distribute an amount of $10,000 each to artists and /or arts projects

Governors' Award
The Arts Foundation of New Zealand Governors' Award recognises an individual or institution that has contributed in a significant way to the development of the arts and artists in New Zealand. The recipients are chosen by Arts Foundation Governors, with each recipient receiving a plaque designed by Auckland artist Jim Wheeler.

To date two awards have been made:

The inaugural recipient was the University of Otago in recognition of its contribution to the arts community through its Burns, Hodgkins and Mozart Fellowships. The three Fellowships were set up through the generosity of anonymous benefactors and have subsequently been funded by additional grants to maintain their value.

The second presentation was made to Concert FM (now Radio New Zealand Concert).  The Arts Foundation of New Zealand Governors recognised the contribution that Concert FM has made in supporting New Zealand composers, musicians, writers and actors at a national level.  The Arts Foundation also acknowledged Concert FM's contribution to the arts through its recording collaborations and the Douglas Lilburn Prize (a joint initiative between Concert FM and the New Zealand Symphony Orchestra).

In 2009 a third presentation was made to the Govett-Brewster Art Gallery, New Plymouth.  In making their selection, Arts Foundation Governors acknowledged the commitment by the Govett-Brewster Art Gallery to the cause of contemporary art, particularly from Aotearoa New Zealand, over the last four decades.

Marti Friedlander Photographic Award
The Marti Friedlander Photographic Award, supported by the Arts Foundation of New Zealand is presented every two years to an established photographer with a record of excellence and the potential to carry on producing work at high levels. The award includes a donation of $25,000NZD for the photographer to use as they please.

The inaugural recipient selected and announced by Marti Friedlander, was Edith Amituanai – a widely exhibited artist and a finalist in a number of awards, including the 2008 Walters Prize. Extended family and immediate community are primary subjects for Edith; she collaborates closely with her Christchurch and Auckland relatives as well as people she grew up with in West Auckland.

John Miller (an independent social documentary photographer, renowned particularly for his protest images) and Mark Adams (a photographer working with subjects of cross-cultural significance) were joint recipients in 2009.

Recipients
 Edith Amituanai (2007)
 John Miller and Mark Adams (2009)
 Neil Pardington (2011)
 Jono Rotman (2013)
 Rodney Charters (2015)
 Roberta Thornley (2017)
 Solomon Mortimer (2019)

Harriet Friedlander Residency
On 26 June 2008, the Harriet Friedlander Scholarship Trust and the Arts Foundation launched a new international residency. A supporter of the arts, Harriet Friedlander also loved the vibrant culture of New York. When Michael and Harriet Friedlander and their sons Jason and Daniel designed the residency, Harriet was clear that she did not want to place any expectations or responsibilities on the recipient. An artist was to be sent to New York to have an "experience", all expenses paid, so that they could immerse themselves in the culture and process it in their own way.

One of the most generous residencies offered to a New Zealand artist, up to $80,000NZD is made available every two years for their travel and living expenses. This opportunity is available to an artist aged 30 to 40, practicing in any discipline. The inaugural curator was Gregory O'Brien and the inaugural recipient was filmmaker Florian Habicht.

Recipients
 film maker Florian Habicht (2009)
 multimedia visual artist Seung Yul Oh (2010)
 playwright and actor Arthur Meek (2012)
 choreographer, dancer and video artist Louise Potiki Bryant (2014)
 filmmaker/cinematographer Christopher Pryor (2016)
 filmmaker/writer/director Miriam Smith (2016)
 composer and saxophonist Lucien Johnson (2018)
 dancer and choreographer Lucy Marinkovich (2018)
 performance artist Kalisolaite ‘Uhila (2021)

References

External links
Arts Foundation website
Friedlander Foundation
Boosted

New Zealand art awards
Arts organisations based in New Zealand
2000 establishments in New Zealand